Henry Christopher Wallich (June 10, 1914 – September 15, 1988) was a German American economist who served as a member of the Federal Reserve Board of Governors from 1974 to 1986. He previously served as a member of the Council of the Economic Advisers under President Dwight D. Eisenhower. Wallich also held a professorship of economics at Yale University. He was best known as an economic columnist for Newsweek magazine, from 1965 until he joined The Federal Reserve. For a period he wrote one week in three, with Milton Friedman and Paul Samuelson, with their 1967 columns earning the magazine a Gerald Loeb Special Award in 1968.

Early life
Wallich was born in Berlin on June 10, 1914, to Paul and Hildegard Rehrmann Wallich. His father and paternal grandfather were both bankers. Wallich had a brother, Walter, and a sister, Christel. He began 10 years at the Federal Reserve Bank of New York in 1941, becoming chief of its foreign research division. He earned a Ph.D. (Doctor of Philosophy) from Harvard University in 1944, and became an American citizen in the same year.

Work
Wallich interests included the developing country economies in the third world. He became a consultant to officials of Puerto Rico, the Dominican Republic and Cuba in the pre-Castro era. He served on the advisory board of the Arms Control and Disarmament Agency in 1972-73 and was the United States representative on the United Nations Experts Panel on the Economic Consequences of the Arms Race. Before joining the Federal Reserve Board, he was a director of the Phoenix Mutual Life Insurance Company, the United Illuminating Company, the Lionel Edie Capital Fund and the First New Haven National Bank, and other institutions.

He was appointed by President Richard Nixon as a Governor of the Federal Reserve System, in 1974 as one of the Fed's seven Governors. and served until 1986, resigning from poor health. 
Mr. Wallich's  proposal espoused in 1971 with Sidney Weintraub, a liberal economist, for a tax-based incomes policy, or TIP. The plan, to control inflation, required an income-tax surcharge to be levied on companies raising their average wage level above specified inflation-related guide-lines. The Wallich-Weintraub plan never became law. He was the board's main emissary to the Bank for International Settlements, the institution in Basel, Switzerland, that serves the world's central banks.

Personal life and later years
In 1950 he married Mable Inness Brown, an economist from Floral Park, Long Island. They met while both were working at the Federal Reserve Bank of New York. After failing health and an operation on a brain tumour, he died in 1988 at George Washington University Hospital aged 74. He was survived by his wife, Mable, mother Hildegard, and children, Christine Wallich, Anna Wallich and Paul Wallich.

Works
The Mainsprings of the German Revival (1955)
The Cost of Freedom, Conservatives and Modern Capitalism, The Case For A Free Economy (1960)

Awards

 1974 Gerald Loeb Award for Columns/Editorial for "Trust Busting the USA"

References
International Monetary Cooperation: Essays in Honor of Henry C. Wallich (1987)

Notes

External links
Statements and Speeches of Henry Christopher Wallich

1914 births
1988 deaths
20th-century American non-fiction writers
20th-century American economists
Federal Reserve System governors
Gerald Loeb Award winners for Columns, Commentary, and Editorials
Harvard University alumni
Nixon administration personnel
Ford administration personnel
Carter administration personnel
Reagan administration personnel
United States Council of Economic Advisers
German emigrants to the United States
Member of the Mont Pelerin Society